Renato João Saleiro Santos (born 5 October 1991) is a Portuguese professional footballer who plays as a right winger for S.C.U. Torreense.

Club career
Born in Estarreja, Aveiro District, Santos played youth football for two clubs, including Sporting CP from ages 11 to 18. Having signed with Rio Ave F.C. in the summer of 2010, he was successively loaned to Moreirense F.C. and C.D. Aves, with both sides competing in the Segunda Liga.

Santos returned to the Estádio dos Arcos for the 2013–14 season, making his debut in the Primeira Liga on 28 September 2013 when he came as a 64th-minute substitute in a 0–3 home loss against C.D. Nacional. In January 2015, he was once again loaned to a second-tier team, contributing 12 starts as C.D. Tondela promoted to the top flight for the first time in its history.

On 31 August 2015, Boavista F.C. signed free agent Santos to a three-year contract. He played 29 games in all competitions in his first year, scoring four goals.

Firmly established in the starting XI under both Erwin Sánchez and his successor Miguel Leal, Santos netted from spectacular efforts to help to away wins over Rio Ave (2–1, 6 November 2016) and C.D. Nacional (2–0, 22 December). Late in the year, he agreed to a new two-year deal.

On 17 July 2018, Santos signed a three-year contract with Segunda División club Málaga CF. He was released on 3 October 2020 along with seven other first-team players, due to a layoff.

References

External links

1991 births
Living people
Sportspeople from Aveiro District
Portuguese footballers
Association football wingers
Primeira Liga players
Liga Portugal 2 players
Sporting CP footballers
Rio Ave F.C. players
Moreirense F.C. players
C.D. Aves players
C.D. Tondela players
Boavista F.C. players
S.C.U. Torreense players
Segunda División players
Primera Federación players
Málaga CF players
Algeciras CF footballers
Super League Greece players
Volos N.F.C. players
K League 2 players
Busan IPark players
Portuguese expatriate footballers
Expatriate footballers in Spain
Expatriate footballers in Greece
Expatriate footballers in South Korea
Portuguese expatriate sportspeople in Spain
Portuguese expatriate sportspeople in Greece
Portuguese expatriate sportspeople in South Korea